Fabián Muñoz may refer to:

 Fabián Muñoz (Chilean footballer) (born 1978), Chilean footballer 
 Fabián Muñoz (Argentine footballer) (born 1991), Argentine football forward